Cavan is a commune in the Côtes-d'Armor department of Brittany in northwestern France.

Population

Inhabitants of Cavan are called Cavanais in French.

Breton language
The municipality launched a linguistic plan through Ya d'ar brezhoneg on 27 May 2006.

In 2008, 38.43% of primary school children attended bilingual schools.

See also
Communes of the Côtes-d'Armor department

References

External links

Official website 

Communes of Côtes-d'Armor